Paravendia is an extinct genus of proarticulate vendiamorph that lived in the Ediacaran period, about 553 million years ago. It shares the Vendiidae family with Vendia and Karakhtia. It is a monotypic genus, with the species Paravendia janae.

Description
It is an animal that presents 'bilateral' symmetry, similar in appearance to the previously mentioned genus  Vendia , with new isomers replacing the older ones.

Distribution
Ediacaran of the Russian Federation (Arkhangelsk).

See also
List of ediacaran genera

References

Notes
 Zakrevskaya, Maria. Paleoecological reconstruction of the Ediacaran benthic macroscopic communities of the White Sea (Russia). Palaeogeography, Palaeoclimatology, Palaeoecology 15 September 2014.
 Freeman, Gary. The rise of bilaterians. Historical Biology 2009 03. 

Vendiamorpha
Ediacaran life
Fossils of Russia
Prehistoric bilaterian genera